Bulla quoyii, or the brown bubble snail, is a species of sea snail, a marine gastropod mollusc in the family Bullidae, the bubble snails.

Description
The size of an adult shell varies between 35 and 55 mm. The thin, yellowish-brown shell has an elongated to ovate-quadrangular shape and shows anterior spiral grooves. The shell is wider on the front side. The white aperture becomes narrower at its top. The spire contains six or seven whorls with raised striae. The lip is pale brown. The columella is white. The color of the periostracum varies from greenish to orange.

Distribution
This species occurs in the North Island of New Zealand and southern Australia, northern Tasmania, and the Kermadec Islands.

References

 Powell A. W. B., New Zealand Mollusca, William Collins Publishers Ltd, Auckland, New Zealand 1979 
 Glen Pownall, New Zealand Shells and Shellfish, Seven Seas Publishing Pty Ltd, Wellington, New Zealand 1979 
 SeaslugForum

External links
 

Bullidae
Gastropods of Australia
Gastropods of New Zealand
Fauna of Western Australia
Gastropods described in 1943